Norma Wainwright is a former international lawn bowls competitor for Australia.

She won the fours gold medal at the 1988 World Outdoor Bowls Championship in Auckland.

References

Date of birth unknown
Australian female bowls players
Bowls World Champions
Living people
Year of birth missing (living people)
20th-century Australian women

Lawn Bowls WA Hall of Fame 2007